Alfred Visagie (born 17 September 1972) is a South African sprinter. He competed in the men's 200 metres and 4x400m at the 1996 Summer Olympics.

References

External links
 

1972 births
Living people
Athletes (track and field) at the 1996 Summer Olympics
South African male sprinters
Olympic athletes of South Africa
Sportspeople from Johannesburg